Kratzeburg station is a railway station in the municipality of Kratzeburg, located in the Mecklenburgische Seenplatte district in Mecklenburg-Vorpommern, Germany.

References

Railway stations in Mecklenburg-Western Pomerania
Buildings and structures in Mecklenburgische Seenplatte (district)